Kota Sentosa is a state constituency in Sarawak, Malaysia, that has been represented in the Sarawak State Legislative Assembly since 2006.

The state constituency was created in the 2005 redistribution and is mandated to return a single member to the Sarawak State Legislative Assembly under the first past the post voting system.

History

Polling districts 
According to the gazette issued on 30 December 2015, the Kota Sentosa constituency has a total of 6 polling districts.

Representation history

Election results

References

Sarawak state constituencies